Hababa is a Syrian village in the Duraykish District in Tartous Governorate. According to the Syria Central Bureau of Statistics (CBS), Hababa had a population of 769 in the 2004 census.

References

Alawite communities in Syria
Populated places in Duraykish District